Charles Abel Moysey   (26 November 1779 – 17 December 1859) was Archdeacon of Bath from 1820 to 1839.

Moysey's father, Abel Moysey, was Member for Bath from 1774 until 1790. He was educated at Christ Church, Oxford. After a curacy in Southwick, Hampshire he held incumbencies at Hinton Parva, Martyr Worthy and Walcot, Bath.

Notes

1859 deaths
Alumni of Christ Church, Oxford
Archdeacons of Bath
1779 births